Thomas Percival Griffiths (21 February 1906 – 25 December 1981) was a Welsh international footballer of the 1930s.

Tom Griffiths was born in Moss Valley, Wrexham. A center-half, Griffiths was a tall, rangy player who joined home-town club Wrexham in 1922, transferring to Everton in 1926. Despite his efforts, the Merseysiders were relegated at the end of that season. After 78 games for the Toffees, Griffiths was sold to Bolton Wanderers, where he faced a relegation battle again, and he played 48 League games for Wanderers.

Capped by Wales on 21 occasions, Griffiths scored three goals in the course of his international career.

References

External links
Aston Villa career details
Everton career details

1906 births
1981 deaths
Footballers from Wrexham
Welsh footballers
Wales international footballers
Wrexham A.F.C. players
Everton F.C. players
Bolton Wanderers F.C. players
Middlesbrough F.C. players
Aston Villa F.C. players
English Football League players
Association football defenders